Isaías Cortés Berumen (born 14 October 1972) is a Mexican politician affiliated with the PAN. He served as Deputy of the LXII Legislature of the Mexican Congress representing Jalisco, having previously served in the Congress of Jalisco.

References

1972 births
Living people
Politicians from Jalisco
National Action Party (Mexico) politicians
21st-century Mexican politicians
University of Guadalajara alumni
Members of the Congress of Jalisco
Deputies of the LXII Legislature of Mexico
Members of the Chamber of Deputies (Mexico) for Jalisco